Stadion Oporowska (formerly the Sportpark Gräbschen) is a football stadium in Wrocław, Poland.  It is the former home ground of Śląsk Wrocław and the current home ground of Śląsk Wrocław II. The stadium holds 8,346 spectators. It was opened in 1926 when Wrocław was part of Germany as Breslau.

open stand (east):  3982 places
Covered Tribune (western): 2784 places
Grandstand North openwork:  1104 places

This gives the 7870 seats for spectators hosts.

Grandstand South openwork (grandstand for visitors supporters): 476 seats

Poland national team matches 
The Poland national football team played one match at the stadium.

See also
2003 Wrocław football riot
Stadion Wrocław

References

External links
 Stadion WKS Śląsk - Sportpark Gräbschen na portralu polska-org.pl

Football venues in Poland
Śląsk Wrocław (football)
Buildings and structures in Wrocław
Sports venues in Lower Silesian Voivodeship